Sherman Garnes (June 8, 1940  – February 26, 1977) was an American singer who was a member of the doo-wop group The Teenagers.
Garnes attended Edward W. Stitt Junior High School where he met Jimmy Merchant. They formed a group, The Earth Angels, and in 1954, joined Herman Santiago and Joe Negroni to form The Coupe De Villes, which later, with the addition of Frankie Lymon, became The Teenagers who had a hit song with Why Do Fools Fall in Love. He died on February 26, 1977, after suffering from a heart attack. He was only 36 years old. He was posthumously inducted into the Rock and Roll Hall of Fame in 1993 as a member of the Teenagers.

Personal life

Garnes was 6 ft. 6 in. tall and had a size 13 shoe. Garnes has a daughter named Leslie Garnes Carlisle (Moguel).

References

The Teenagers members
1940 births
1977 deaths
20th-century American singers